"There’s No Way" is a song recorded by American singer-songwriter Lauv featuring American singer-songwriter Julia Michaels. It was released on September 27, 2018.

Background and composition 
Lauv described the process of creating "There's No Way", stating: "The first time [me and Michaels] met we didn’t even write a song, we just talked about life and emo bands and stuff. A few days later me, her, Justin Tranter and Ian Kirkpatrick got into the room and wrote ‘There’s No Way.’"

"There's No Way" is a "flirtatious" bubblegum pop song with a length of two minutes and fifty four seconds. It is in the key of D major and moves at a tempo of 147 beats per minute. A love song, it has been described as a "call-and-response tale of romantic feelings." Michaels described the song as being “about wanting to be with someone, but sometimes the timing is wrong.”

Critical reception 
Robin Murray of Clash called the song a "beautiful new single."

Music video 
An accompanying music video was released to promote the single. The singers portray bandmates on tour who share an array of intimate moments, despite having their own lovers. The video ends with the two singers going their separate ways.

Live performances 
Lauv and Julia Michaels performed "There's No Way" on The Late Show with Stephen Colbert on October 1, 2018. On November 28, 2018, they again performed the song on The Late Late Show with James Corden.

Track listing 
Digital download

 "There's No Way" (featuring Julia Michaels) - 2:54

Remixes EP

 "There's No Way" (featuring Julia Michaels) [Alle Farben Remix] - 3:07
 "There's No Way" (featuring Julia Michaels) [Synapson Remix] - 3:18
 "There's No Way" (featuring Julia Michaels) [MYRNE Remix] - 4:29
 "There's No Way" (featuring Julia Michaels) [Cat Dealers Remix] - 2:57

Live from Box Fresh, London, 2018

 There's No Way (feat. Julia Michaels) [Live from Box Fresh, London, 2018] - 2:44

Charts

Certifications

References

2018 singles
2018 songs
Lauv songs
Julia Michaels songs
Songs written by Lauv
Songs written by Justin Tranter
Songs written by Julia Michaels
Compositions in D major
Songs written by Ian Kirkpatrick (record producer)